Elwood Jr/Sr High School is a public high school located in Elwood, Indiana.

Demographics
The demographic breakdown of the 658 students enrolled in the 2014–2015 school year was:
Male - 49.5%
Female - 50.5%
Native American/Alaskan - 0.0%
Asian/Pacific islanders - 0.3%
Black - 0.8%
Hispanic - 5.9%
White - 90.3%
Multiracial - 2.7%

63.3% of the students were eligible for free or reduced price lunch, making this a Title I school.

Athletics
The Elwood Panthers compete in the Central Indiana Conference.  The school colors are red and royal blue.  The following IHSAA sanctioned sports are offered:

Basketball (boys and girls)
Baseball (boys)
Cross country (boys and girls)
Football (boys)
Golf (boys and girls)
Softball (girls)
Swimming (boys and girls)
Tennis (boys and girls)
Track (boys/girls/unified)
Volleyball (girls)
Wrestling (boys)

See also
 List of high schools in Indiana

References

External links
 Official website

Schools in Madison County, Indiana
Public high schools in Indiana
Public middle schools in Indiana